Aaron Taylor (born January 21, 1975) is a former American college football player for the University of Nebraska.  Taylor was recognized as an All-American and won the Outland Trophy in 1997.

Early years
Taylor was born in Wichita Falls, Texas.  He attended S. H. Rider High School in Wichita Falls, where he played high school football for the Rider Raiders.

College career
Taylor attended the University of Nebraska, and played for the Nebraska Cornhuskers football team from 1994 to 1997.  As senior in 1997, he won the Outland Trophy as the top college interior lineman in the country.  He is one of seven Nebraska players to have won the Outland Trophy and is the only Husker to be awarded All-American honors at two different positions, offensive center and guard. He was also the winner of the  Jim Parker Award. During his career, he helped the Huskers to a 49-2 record (.961 winning percentage) and four straight bowl game wins, including undefeated seasons and national titles in 1994, 1995 and 1997.  Two of the teams that Nebraska defeated in bowl games in those years, Florida in 1996 and Tennessee in 1998, would go on to win the national title the following year.  Taylor participated in games featuring such memorable plays as Tommie Frazier's 75-yard touchdown run against the Florida Gators in the 1996 Fiesta Bowl and the Flea Kicker against Missouri in 1997.  His jersey number 67 was retired by Nebraska in 1998, becoming one of just 16 Husker players so honored.  In 1999, he was selected to the Nebraska All-Century Football Team via fan poll and in 2002 was named to the Athlon Sports Nebraska All-Time Team.

Collegiate All Century Teams
In 2010 Taylor was selected as a third-team offensive guard by Sports Illustrated in their "NCAA Football All-Century Team".  The starters were Jim Parker of Ohio State and John Hannah of Alabama, the second-team consisted of Bob Suffridge of Tennessee and Bill Fischer of Notre Dame and the other third-team player was Dean Steinkuhler of Nebraska.   He was one of six Nebraska Cornhuskers selected to this 85 man roster; the others being Rich Glover, Johnny Rodgers, Dave Rimington, Dean Steinkuhler and Tommie Frazier.

In 1999 Taylor was selected as a starting offensive guard to the Walter Camp Football Foundation College Football All Century Team.  The other offensive guards selected were John Hannah of Alabama, Dean Steinkuhler of Nebraska, Brad Budde of USC, Will Shields of Nebraska and Jim Parker of Ohio State.  Taylor was one of six Nebraska Cornhuskers selected to this 83 man team; the others being Rodgers, Rimington, Steinkuhler, Shields and Frazier.

Professional career
After Nebraska, Taylor was drafted in the 7th round of the 1998 NFL Draft by the Indianapolis Colts.  Taylor played for the Colts for the first part of the 1998 season before becoming a member of the Chicago Bears.

Personal
After the 1998 season, Taylor retired from professional football to start a career in business and to help coach high school football. Taylor currently works for Union Pacific Railroad in Omaha, Nebraska.

References

External links
 Nebraska profile
 

1975 births
Living people
People from Wichita Falls, Texas
Players of American football from Texas
American football offensive guards
Nebraska Cornhuskers football players
All-American college football players
College Football Hall of Fame inductees
Indianapolis Colts players
Chicago Bears players